Kamchatka is the debut album of Swedish Kamchatka, a 14-track album containing 3 covers: "I Love Everybody" originally written by Johnny Winter, Auto Modown and Spacegirl Blues by Gerald V Casale. The album was recorded by Nicholas Elgstrand and Kamchatka, mixed by Nicholas Elgstrand and Kamchatka at Shrimpmonkey studios and mastered by Bullen and Kamchatka at Mega Studios.

Track listing
  "Out Of My Way" (Andersson, Strandvik)
  "Seed" (Öjersson, Andersson)
  "No" (Öjersson)
  "Mnemosyne Waltz" (Öjersson, Andersson)
  "Mixed Emotions" (Andersson)
  "Wrong End..." (Öjersson, Andersson, Strandvik)
  "Eggshell" (Öjersson)
  "I Love Everybody" (Johnny Winter)
  "Auto Mowdown" (Gerald V Casale)
  "Spacegirl Blues" (Gerald V Casale)
  "Sing Along Song" (Öjersson)
  "Incognito" (Andersson, Strandvik, Öjersson, Elgstrand)
  "Daddy Says" (Öjersson)
  "Squirm" (Öjersson, Andersson, Strandvik)(includes bonus track)

Credits

Band
Thomas "Juneor" Andersson - guitar & lead vocals
Roger Öjersson - bass & lead vocals
Tobias Strandvik - drums

Personnel
Nicolas Elgstrand - producer
Joe Romagnola - executive producer
Jennelie Andersson - band photos
Hippograffix - cover art layout & design (also Armageddon - Three amongst others)

External links
Review excerpts from Grooveyard records

References 

2007 albums
Kamchatka (band) albums